State v. Kelly, 97 N.J. 178; 478 A.2d 364 (1984), is a Supreme Court of New Jersey case where the defendant, Gladys Kelly, was on trial for the murder of her husband, Ernest Kelly with a pair of scissors. The Supreme Court reversed the case for further trial after finding that expert testimony regarding the defence's submission, that Kelly suffered from battered woman syndrome, was incorrectly excluded since battered woman syndrome was a proper subject for expert evidence. Kelly was represented by Charles S. Lorber who is now with Mandelbaum Salsburg of West Orange N.J.

Implications
This is a notable case, both regarding the role of experts in new fields and in trials where the battered woman defense may be advanced, as is demonstrated by it being cited in other states, by universities, and by the US Government.

Further, it is cited as one of the notable opinions by Chief Justice Robert Wilentz.

References

External links
 

New Jersey state case law
Domestic violence
United States murder case law
1984 in United States case law
1984 in New Jersey
Mariticides